The Chinese General Hospital Colleges is a medical university located in Manila, Philippines. It was established in 1921 as the Chinese General Hospital School of Nursing (CGHSN). It is owned and managed by the Philippine Chinese Charitable Association (PCCA) Inc. as a non-profit service organization. In 2012 the College began to offer courses such as Bachelor of Science in Medical Technology, BS in Psychology, BS in Radiologic Technology and Diploma in Midwifery. In 2017 it opened the College of Medicine, which incorporates Traditional Chinese Medicine in its curriculum.

History
The Chinese General Hospital Colleges (Formerly Known as Chinese General Hospital College of Nursing and Liberal Arts) was established in 1921 as the Chinese General Hospital School of Nursing (CGHSN). The idea was conceived by Dr. Jose Tee Han Kee, who was the Director of the Chinese General Hospital. With him were three physicians who organized the training school. The Missionary Sisters of the Immaculate Conception (M.I.C. Sisters) with mission houses in Hong Kong and Canton, China were requested by Dr. Tee Han Kee to help in starting the school. The first batch of five sisters arrived in August 1921. Mrs. Praxedes Co Tui, a registered nurse from the Philippine General Hospital was appointed as Chief Nurse and the first Principal of the School of Nursing.

CGHC is owned and managed by the Philippine Chinese Charitable Association (PCCA) Inc. The PCCA is a non-stock, non-profit service organization.

In 2012, The College began to offer new courses namely: BS in Medical Technology, BS in Psychology, BS in Radiologic Technology and Diploma in Midwifery.

In 2017, It opened the College of Medicine, which is the only school in the country that offers Doctor of Medicine with incorporation of Traditional Chinese Medicine in its curriculum. Also the same year the college begun to offer BS Physical Therapy and Senior High School (STEM Strand) and Caregiving NCII. In 2021, 

In 2022, the college has also offered non-medical courses under its College of Accountancy and Entrepreneurship with two degree programs: BS in Accountancy and BS in Management Accounting, along with the integration of the Accountancy and Business Management Strand in the Senior High School Department.

See also
List of universities and colleges in the Philippines

References

Nursing schools in the Philippines
Universities and colleges in Manila
Education in Santa Cruz, Manila
Educational institutions established in 1921
1921 establishments in the Philippines